Esmail Mahmudi (also Romanized as Esmā‘īl Maḩmūdī and Esmāeel Maḩmūdī) is a village in Kabgan Rural District, Kaki District, Dashti County, Bushehr Province, Iran. At the 2006 census, its population was 198, in 41 families.

References 

Populated places in Dashti County